Talasea is a village on the Talasea Peninsula, West New Britain Province, Papua New Guinea. It is located in Talasea Rural LLG.

References

Populated places in West New Britain Province